The term toreutics, relatively rarely used in English, refers to artistic metalworking – hammering gold or silver (or other materials), engraving, or using repoussé and chasing to form minute detailed reliefs or small engraved patterns.  Toreutics can include metal-engraving – forward-pressure linear metal removal with a burin.

Toreutics is extremely ancient, and depending on the metal used will survive burial for periods of centuries better than art in many other materials.  Conversely if above ground it was likely to be melted down and the metal reused. Until the Middle Ages it was also among the art forms with the highest prestige.

Archeological background
It was practised in the Bronze Age and was well established centuries before the shaft graves. Toureutic items of special quality from the Iron Age are the Certosa situla from Italy and from Slovenia the Vače situla and the Vače belt-plate. Toreutics flourished to an unusual degree among the peoples of Asia Minor, Assyria, Babylon, and passed from thence to ancient Persia. One spectacular example of the direct influence of Persia in toreutics is believed to be the Treasure of Nagyszentmiklós found in Transylvania in 1799, and considered to be work of Old Bulgarian gold smiths. It consists of 23 vessels and has been attributed to Attila's Huns, the Avars and Pechenegs. The majority of scholars however, consider it Bulgarian (Proto-Bulgarians, Bulgars), because of its runic inscriptions.

Etymology 
The art of working metal or other materials by the use of embossing and chasing to form minute detailed reliefs. The origin of toreutics goes back to 1830–40; < Gk , equiv. to  'to bore, chase, emboss' (v. deriv. of  graving tool) -tikos.

Contemporary masters of Persian toreutics 

 Bahram Elyasi, who is unique in his work and has first-class art and masterpieces all over the world, is an Isfahani-style engraver. He has been called the engraver of Farshchian. A work in the Saadabad collection, a work in the collection of the Museum of Contemporary Art in Tehran, a work in the War Museum, a work in the Museum The Islamic Conference and two works called "Polo" are housed in the Utah State Museum in the United States.
 Ali Rahimi is a famous master of engraving and has a new style. His special engraving works include 10 to 15 different professional characters related to a historical period. Each character came with their own unique clothing and accessories, along with images of trees, flowers and chickens in the field of work, hammered on the spherical and conical surfaces of copper and silver objects. He died in 1372 and was buried in Rezvan Garden in Isfahan.
 Ebrahim Latkhafi was one of the famous and prominent masters of calligraphy and astrolabe in Isfahan. Latkhafi died on March 20, 2012, and was buried in the artists' section of Rezvan Garden in Isfahan.
 Mohammad Mehdi Babakhani, holder of a first-class art badge, is one of the famous masters and the name of this artist was born in Arak, Iran in 1974. He has created a new style in this field. One of the artist's works was selected by the United Nations Intellectual Property Organization (WIPO) in 2002, which is currently kept in the Museum of Genesis. Some of his works are kept in the Museum of Traditional Arts of Saad Abad and Hassanpour Museum of Arak, etc.
 Hossein Alagmandan, born in 1310 in Isfahan, was one of the prominent masters and master of the name of Isfahan engraving, who died on March 25, 2017. His works are on public view in Saadabad and other museums in Iran.
 Mehdi Zofan is one of the top designers and engravers in the style of engraving in the contemporary period. He reached such a level in the art of drawing that his master in painting offered to implement his works in metal and encouraged him in this direction. Until the 200 works she created during her creative life are immortalized on copper. After 90 years, he died in 1399. 

 Bahram Elyasi was born in 1956 in Shahrekord, Iran. He is a prominent Iranian calligrapher. He has painted and created miniatures on metal surfaces At the age of 15, he started working in the field of engraving with professors such as Shah Mirza and Reza Gohari Mehr, resulting in several lasting works until 1398 AH. Elyasi makes miniatures with metal brushes on copper, which are unique in kind. Some of the miniature designs of Elyasi's works were created by him and others with the collaboration of Abbas Rostamian. In his works, Elyasi emphasizes more than anything else the figures and organs in the form of historical facts and various Iranian-Islamic events. His exhibitions abroad include two in the United Kingdom, one in Switzerland, several in Dubai and on the outskirts of Iran, after which they have received various accolades, and domestic museums in Iran have purchased some of their works. The Dervishes are in the Saadabad Palace and another in the Museum of the Islamic Conference.

Artwork of Persian poets by Elyasi 

Elyasi, with the aim of reviving the names of educated figures such as famous Iranian poets and scientists in the context of his art, began to create several different works called "celebrities" in 1992. His first work was completed two years later, and the construction of his second painting of celebrities, which includes more than 40 different figures and mostly refers to poetry reading and divination among Iranians, measuring 1 meter long and 70 centimeters wide, was completed in 2006. Receipt. Five years later, in 2011, it was recognized as the best Oriental work of the year at the annual Art Fair auction in Vienna. Also, his first painting of celebrities was unveiled for the first time in the 26th handicrafts exhibition, and he announced that he had worked for this work for two years and eight hours a day. This work is 2 meters and 40 centimeters long and 1 meter 40 centimeters wide. It is made of copper and covered with tin, which includes the figures of Abu Ali Sina, Rumi, Saadi, Khayyam and Ferdowsi. According to Elyasi, this painting has five parts. From the right, the painting starts with the image of a hunting ground and ends with the image of a potter after the game of polo and life in the form of an ellipse, which is a metaphor for the end of life. It is gray. In the middle of the painting, a picture of dervishes and Dora is engraved around the poets' poems.

Buds of the Prophets of Bahram Elyasi 
The new work of Isfahani artist Elyasi named Ghancheh Anbia was officially unveiled at the 32nd National Exhibition of Iranian Handicrafts in Tehran with the presence of Dr. Ali Asghar Monsan, Minister of Cultural Heritage, Tourism and Handicrafts. The height of 2 meters and 70 centimeters has been created continuously for four years and has been prepared in three stages of design, volume making and engraving. And the solidarity between religions and the common message among all divine prophets.

Applications 
Greek style, Inscriptions on toreutics
 Achaemenid–Persian–Sassanid style, Christian toreutics, Folk craftsmanship, Bulgaria
 Beaten copper (Tibet)
 Tsuba gold toreutics (1860) Mito school.

See also
 Goldsmith
 History of decorative arts
 Persian-Sassanide art patterns
 Preslav treasure
 Shoami
 Treasure of Nagyszentmiklós
 Umetada

References 

Artworks in metal
Bronze Age art
Iron Age art
Persian handicrafts